Stephan Groth (born 10 August 1971) is a Danish-Norwegian singer. He is the man behind Apoptygma Berzerk, an electronic body music act that plays in styles such as synthpop and futurepop. 

Groth was born in Odense but relocated with his family to his father's home town Sarpsborg, Norway, in 1986.

Along with Ronan Harris of VNV Nation and the members of Covenant, he is considered by many to be one of the pioneers of the futurepop genre of the late 1990s and early 2000s. Groth is also a member of Fairlight Children, which is a lighter, more pop-oriented electronic act. Stephan had a guest appearance in Satyricon's album Megiddo.

References

External links 
 Apoptygma Berzerk-Myspace from Stephan Groth
 Interview with Stephan Groth on beatfinder
 Interview with Stephan Groth on NXLive.co.uk

1971 births
Apoptygma Berzerk members
Industrial musicians
Living people
Synth-pop singers
People from Odense
Danish people of Norwegian descent
Electronic body music musicians
Musicians from Sarpsborg